Hassan Sardar (Urdu: حسن سردار) (born 22 October 1957 in Karachi, Pakistan) is a former field hockey player and team captain from Pakistan, who won the gold medal with the Men's National Hockey Team at the 1984 Summer Olympics in Los Angeles, California.

A Karachi native, Sardar studied in Habib Public High School and graduated from Aitchison College Lahore. Arguably the best centre forward Pakistan has ever produced, he started his international career in the early 1980s and played his first World Hockey Cup in 1982 held in Mumbai, India.  Graceful and deadly, he played in arguably the best forward line Pakistan has ever had along with Shahnaz Sheikh, Samiullah Khan, Hanif Khan and Kalimullah Khan. Sardar was declared 'Man of the Tournament' for scoring 11 world cup goals and Pakistan took the gold.

In the 1982 Asian Games in New Delhi, he helped crush India with a hat-trick as Pakistan triumphed 7–1 under the Captaincy of Samiullah. He was instrumental in leading Pakistan to a gold medal at the 1984 Olympics in Los Angeles. He later managed the Pakistani Hockey Team. He has also been the Chief Selector of Pakistan hockey team. Hassan Sardar is ranked among the 'Top 10 greatest field hockey players'.

Awards and recognition
 Pride of Performance Award by the President of Pakistan in 1984.
 Sitara-i-Imtiaz Award by the President of Pakistan in 2014.

See also
Pakistan Hockey Federation

References

External links
 
 Profile of Hassan Sardar at Asian Women Magazine

1957 births
Living people
Pakistani male field hockey players
Aitchison College alumni
Olympic field hockey players of Pakistan
Field hockey players at the 1984 Summer Olympics
Medalists at the 1984 Summer Olympics
Olympic gold medalists for Pakistan
Olympic medalists in field hockey
Recipients of Sitara-i-Imtiaz
Recipients of the Pride of Performance
Asian Games gold medalists for Pakistan
Medalists at the 1982 Asian Games
Asian Games medalists in field hockey
Field hockey players at the 1982 Asian Games